Tomissa is a genus of moths of the family Crambidae. It contains only one species, Tomissa concisella, which is found in Sarawak.

References

Natural History Museum Lepidoptera genus database

Crambinae
Crambidae genera
Taxa named by Francis Walker (entomologist)
Monotypic moth genera